Events in the year 1922 in Bulgaria.

Incumbents

Events 

 19 November – A referendum on the prosecution of war criminals was held and approved by 74.33% of voters.
 23 February  1922  Lord Newton had given Notice to ask if the Supreme Council are still insisting upon the formation of voluntary Armies in Bulgaria and Hungary in spite of the excessive additional expenditure involved and the difficulty of obtaining recruits.

References 

 
1920s in Bulgaria
Years of the 20th century in Bulgaria
Bulgaria
Bulgaria